John B. and Lydia Edwards House is a historic home located at Oswego in Oswego County, New York.   It is a two-story, rectangular frame residence built between 1834 and 1835.  Its owner John B. Edwards was abolitionist Gerrit Smith's agent at Oswego and the house is well documented as a way station on the Underground Railroad.

It was listed on the National Register of Historic Places in 2001.

References

Houses on the National Register of Historic Places in New York (state)
Houses completed in 1835
Houses in Oswego County, New York
Houses on the Underground Railroad
National Register of Historic Places in Oswego County, New York
Underground Railroad in New York (state)